Morfydd Clark (born ) is a Welsh actress. She is best known for her role as Galadriel in the Amazon Prime fantasy series The Lord of the Rings: The Rings of Power (2022–). She received a number of accolades for her performance in the film Saint Maud (2019), including a BAFTA Cymru as well as BIFA and BAFTA Rising Star Award nominations.

Clark's other films include Love & Friendship (2016), Interlude in Prague (2017), and The Personal History of David Copperfield (2019). Also on television, she played Mina Harker in Dracula (2020) and Sister Clara in His Dark Materials (2019).

Early life
Clark was born in Sweden and moved with her family to Penarth, Wales, when she was two years old. She described her father as a "Northern Irish Glaswegian", and her maternal side is from North Wales. Her parents spoke English together, but her maternal grandparents were Welsh speakers, which led to her attending a Welsh language school. She is bi-lingual in English and Welsh. Her first taste of acting was playing Mrs Dai Bread in a school production of Under Milk Wood. After struggling with dyslexia and ADHD, she left school at 16. In 2009, she was accepted to British Youth Music Theatre's production of According to Brian Haw and to the National Youth Theatre of Wales, before training at the Drama Centre London.

Career
Clark left Drama Centre in her final term to star in Saunders Lewis' play Blodeuwedd with Theatr Genedlaethol Cymru. She has appeared in Violence and Son at the Royal Court, as Juliet in Romeo and Juliet at the Crucible Theatre, Sheffield, and in Les Liaisons Dangereuses at the Donmar Warehouse. She played Frederica Vernon in Whit Stillman's film Love & Friendship. In 2016, Clark was named as one of the Screen International Stars of Tomorrow for her early work in television and theatre. She appeared in the film The Call Up and as Cordelia in King Lear at The Old Vic. In 2017, she starred in Interlude In Prague, and portrayed Catherine Dickens in The Man Who Invented Christmas.

In 2019, she appeared in the films Crawl, The Personal History of David Copperfield, and Eternal Beauty. Also that year, Clark starred as Maud in the psychological horror film Saint Maud, for which, she was nominated for Best Actress of the 2020 British Independent Film Awards. For her performance as Maud, she won the BAFTA Cymru best actress award,  and the 2021 BAFTA Rising Star Award.

The Rings of Power 
In December 2019, it was reported (and in early 2020, confirmed) that Clark would portray a younger version of the character Galadriel in The Lord of the Rings: The Rings of Power on Amazon Prime. 

Morfydd has cited that she is "proud" that being a Welsh speaker influenced her portrayal of her bilingual character, Galadriel. The actor stated, “I feel I can be much more romantic and deep in Welsh. So that was really useful for me, because I was thinking, ‘[What’s the] language of her heart? What language does she think in?'" In another interview, the actor discussed her education in Welsh: “Well, I went to a Welsh language school and everything is taught in Welsh. Welsh is phonetic, so it’s great for people with dyslexia. I started learning English in the third year. What my Tolkien-obsessed mother was really proud of and passed on to us was that Tolkien was inspired by the Welsh. Oddly enough, his work was a badge of honour for me, because the Welsh are Welsh and obsessed with anything Welsh." She also mentioned enjoying speaking in Welsh on-set with co-stars Owain Arthur and Trystan Gravelle.

Filmography

Film

Television

Awards and nominations

References

External links

 Living people
1990 births
21st-century Welsh actresses
Actresses from Cardiff
 Alumni of British Youth Music Theatre
 British expatriates in Sweden
 People from Penarth
 Welsh people of Irish descent
 Welsh people of Scottish descent